Cheng Okon Efiong-Fuller (born 15 April 1980) professionally credited as Cheng Fuller is a Nigerian actor, model, film-maker and marketing professional who gained prominence as the inaugural Vice President of Marketing of Nigerian indigenous retail chain, Hubmart stores. He is also known for his recurring role as Barrister Taylor on DSTV's long-running telenovela, Tinsel, as well as his role in the movie Celebrity Marriage, co-starring alongside Tonto Dikeh, Jackie Appiah, Kanayo O Kanayo, Odunlade Adekola, Felix Ugo Omokhodion and Roselyn Ngissah. He is the co-founder of Pandemonium Pictures.

Early life
Fuller was born on 15 April 1980 in Calabar, Cross River State, southern Nigeria.  He was born to the family of  Emmanuel Okon Efiong-Fuller and Josephine Okon Efiong-Fuller. His father Emmanuel was a celebrated academician, and his mother Josephine who passed on in 1994 was a lawyer.
While in secondary school, Fuller represented his school severally at debates and science competitions as well as in musical competitions as a member of the school choir, Hope Waddell Glorious Voices. He went on to study Soil Science in the university, graduating in 2003.

Career
Fuller began his professional career in 2004, taking up employment with the advisory firm KPMG, where he led teams and worked in teams that delivered advisory services to leading companies in the telecommunications, oil and gas, financial services, Fast Moving Consumer Goods (FMCG), aviation, and Infrastructure, Government and Housing (IGH) sectors.

In 2010, Fuller began working at DDB Lagos, serving as Director, Strategy & Business, where he managed the MTN account and later moved to Insight Publicis, serving as the Associate Client Services Director. In 2012, he set up a Marketing Advisory services firm, Re’d’Fyne Business Solutions, which he later abandoned during the Nigerian economic recession of 2014.

In 2015, began working with Hubmart stores, as the pioneer Vice President of Marketing. He achieved a number of notable milestones including the set up and roll out of three additional stores. In the same year, Fuller began appearing as Barrister Taylor on the long-running DSTV series, Tinsel. He has gone on to feature in several notable television series, including playing the role of the titular character in Frank's Teens, and other roles in Hotel Majestic, Eve and the Basketmouth produced My Flatmates. Fuller has starred in full-length Nollywood productions as well, including Forlorn, Badamosi: Portrait of a General and he co-starred with Kenneth Okolie in Drifted.

In December 2019, Fuller was inducted into the fellowship of the Nigerian Institute of Management Consultants.

Politics
In early 2014, Fuller registered in the People's Democratic Party (PDP) Ward 11, Calabar South Constituency 2, and  campaigned for a seat in the Cross River State House of Assembly representing the constituency. He however lost his nomination at the party primaries.

Pandemonium Pictures and Film making
In June 2019, Fuller co-founded an audio-visual production company, Pandemonium pictures with his friend and business partner. The company commenced pre-production on some movie and television projects and is involved in the set up of an independent content broadcast platform for Nigerian film content. In November 2019, it was announced that Pandemonium pictures had begun production on a new film, Black Fate. On 23 November 2019, he released a short film, Endless on the Pandemonium Pictures imprint. The movie had a domestic violence theme, and is the first chapter in the 13 chapter series. In January 2020, Pandemonium pictures began production on a feature film, The Three Ms and a television series, The Benjamins.

Personal life
On 23 November 2019, he married his wife Khemmie Owolabi in a private ceremony in Lagos, Nigeria.

Filmography

References 

Nigerian male film actors
Nigerian male television actors
1980 births
Living people
Nigerian male models